John Manning (born c. 1880) was a rugby union player who represented Australia.

Manning, a fly-half, was born in Sydney and claimed one international rugby cap for Australia, playing against Great Britain, at Brisbane, on 23 July 1904.

References

Australian rugby union players
Australia international rugby union players
Year of birth uncertain
Year of death missing
Rugby union players from Sydney
Rugby union fly-halves